Zhiliang Ying (born April 1960) is a Professor of Statistics in the Department of Statistics, Columbia University.  He served as co-chair of the department.

He received his PhD from Columbia University in 1987, with Tze Leung Lai as his doctoral advisor. He was the Director of the Institute of Statistics at Rutgers University from 1997 to 2001. His wide research interests cover Survival Analysis, Sequential Analysis, Longitudinal Data Analysis, Stochastic Processes, Semiparametric Inference, Biostatistics and Educational Statistics. He is a co-editor of  Statistica Sinica and has been Associate Editor of JASA,  Statistica Sinica,  Annals of Statistics, Biometrics, and Lifetime Data Analysis.

Ying has supervised, collaborated with and encouraged many researchers. He has written or co-authored more than 100 research articles in professional journals.

Selected honours and awards 
 Fellow, Institute of Mathematical Statistics (1995 election)
 Fellow, American Statistical Association (1999 election)
 The Morningside Gold Medal of Applied Mathematics 2004
 The Distinguished Achievement Award 2007, International Chinese Statistical Association

Selected papers 
 Lin, D. Y., Wei, L. J., & Ying, Z. (1993). Checking the Cox model with cumulative sums of martingale-based residuals. Biometrika, 80(3), 557–572.
 Lin, D. Y., & Ying, Z. (1994). Semiparametric analysis of the additive risk model. Biometrika, 81(1), 61–71.
 Chang, H. H., & Ying, Z. (1996). A global information approach to computerized adaptive testing. Applied Psychological Measurement, 20(3), 213–229.
 Jin, Z., Lin, D. Y., Wei, L. J., & Ying, Z. (2003). Rank‐based inference for the accelerated failure time model. Biometrika, 90(2), 341–353.
 Ying, Z. (1993), A large sample study of rank estimation for censored regression data. The Annals of Statistics, 76–99.

References 

1960 births
Columbia University faculty
Chinese statisticians
American statisticians
Living people
Fellows of the American Statistical Association
Fellows of the Institute of Mathematical Statistics
Mathematicians from Shanghai
Educators from Shanghai
Chinese science writers
Writers from Shanghai